Count Petar Čarnojević (
Mača, Kingdom of Hungary, 13 March 1810 - Fenj, Austria-Hungary, 27 April 1892) was a Hungarian nobleman and politician who served as Prefect of Temes County and Royal Commissioner during the Hungarian Revolution of 1848.

Life and career
Čarnojević was born on 13 March 1810 in Mácsa, in Arad County, Hungary. He hailed from a family of Serbian descent whose oldest patriarch had gained Hungarian nobility in 1720. In 1843 he was elected to the Hungarian Parliament for Arad County.

Revolution of 1848-49
At the end of April 1848, during the Hungarian Revolution, the government of Lajos Bacani appointed him Royal Commissioner and Grand Prefect of Tamis County with the task of squelching the insurgents in southern Hungary. He was also awarded the title of Count of Tamis. He served as commissioner from April 26 until the end of July 1848.

Initially, it was supposed to examine the demands of the insurgents, and, if possible, reach an agreement with the Kingdom of Hungary. However, after the riots in Velika Kikinda and the destruction of the Greater Kikinda District, his powers were expanded and his mission changed. His goal was to establish order and peace, property and personal security in Toronto County and to punish the perpetrators of the riots in Velika Kikinda. In the territories of the counties Bačko-Bodroške, Torontalske, Tamiške, Krašovske and Aradska, and in the royal cities Subotica, Sombor, Novi Sad, Arad and Timișoara, as well as in Šajkaškoj oblasti, courts were formed. Many Serbs were sentenced to death and some were hanged.

Both sides condemned him - the Serbs considered him a betrayer of national interests, while the Hungarians resented his indecision and reluctance to use force to quell the Rebellion. In July 1848 Čarnojević was relieved of his duties by the Hungarian government who felt he had not done enough to punish the Serb insurgents. He was replaced by the Deputy Mayor of Tamis Sava Vukovic.

In 1849 he secretly buried his cousin, the infamous Hungarian General János Damjanich as well György Lahner. In 1861, he was a member of the Annunciation Council, when he advocated rapprochement with the Hungarians. He participated little in the political life of the Serbs however. He was a patron of the Arad Theater. From 1865 to 1875 he was a member of the Hungarian Parliament in three cycles.

Personal life
He was married to Ruža, the daughter of the captain Miše Anastasijević. They had a son n Arsenij and a daughter Laura.

Death
Čarnojević died on 27 April 1892 in Fenj. His remains were transferred to the family tomb in Rusko Selo near Kikinda. The obituary states: "The late Čarnojević did not always hit a good path in politics; but he was an honest Serb, who always sincerely wished his people well, and who stood up for them to the best of his ability. He was a good and noble-hearted man."

References

External links 

 Proclamation of Petar Čarnojević on his appointment as royal commissioner, on patriotism and desire to help the Serbian people, assurance that everything can be achieved peacefully, without weapons, Location: Petrovaradin, Year: 1848 - Digital BMS
 Proclamation of Petar Čarnojević to border guards and sailors and invitation to a meeting where they would agree on all their difficulties, requests and wishes, Place: Petrovaradin, Year: 1848 - Digital BMS

1810 births
1892 deaths
People from Arad County
Serbs of Hungary
Hungarian Revolution of 1848